Swansea Metropolitan University is a former university based in Swansea, Wales, UK. The university merged with, and became a constituent campus of, the University of Wales Trinity Saint David on 1 August 2013.

Employing more than 500 staff and teaching over 6,000 students, the Swansea Metropolitan University grew out of the three former Swansea colleges of Art, Teacher Education, and Technology which were founded in 1853, 1872 and 1897 respectively and merged in 1976 to form a centre for the delivery of vocational higher education.

History
For most of the 20th century there were – in addition to Swansea University – three separate further educational institutions serving the city of Swansea: the Swansea (Municipal) School  of Art and Crafts (established in 1853); the Swansea Training College (established in 1872) and Swansea Technical College (established in 1897). Swansea Training College which had been funded by Rose Mary Crawshay was the first place in Wales where women could train as teachers.

During this time, the School of Art and Crafts was based on Alexandra Road, not far from its present location at the bottom of Mount Pleasant Hill opposite Swansea Central Police Station.

The former College of Education was based in the Townhill area of the city where the Metropolitan University's teaching and humanities courses were taught before relocating to the new university development.

Swansea Technical College, formerly based in Mount Pleasant, was a well known and respected supplier of vocational qualifications; where many of the Metropolitan University's programmes were based, including business, computing, engineering, and construction.

In 1976 the three institutions came together to form the West Glamorgan Institute of Higher Education. In 1992 the institution was renamed Swansea Institute of Higher Education and became an independent Higher Education Corporation away from local authority control. In 2008 and following a successful two-year inspection, the Privy Council gave permission for the institution to be renamed Swansea Metropolitan University.

Despite these radical changes, the university has stayed close to its roots, with the three founder institutions still reflected in the four Faculties that make up the university today.

There has been a change in the make-up of the institution over the past half century, moving from three separate establishments offering few higher education programmes, to a university that has now close to 7,000 students and is an established and respected provider of undergraduate, postgraduate and research qualifications, as well as professional programmes. Yet, at the same time, it has stayed a vocationally driven, industry-focused university, serving the local and wider community beyond.

Despite being an institution that focuses on teaching, sixty per cent of the university's research work was rated as being of 'international significance', and in some cases 'world leading' in the 2008 Research Assessment Exercise, with particular strengths in art and design, teaching and engineering.

Both Townhill and Mount Pleasant campuses have now closed due to the university relocating to a new redevelopment based in SA1 waterfront.

Faculties
Swansea Metropolitan University had four faculties:

Faculty of Architecture, Computing & Engineering

The Faculty of Applied Design and Engineering taught skills for engineering, logistics, construction, computing, industrial design, and the creative industries.

Schools:
Engineering
Architecture and Built Environment
Applied Computing

Swansea College of Art
Based in the redeveloped former Dynevor Grammar School, the school is now known as Swansea College of Art a constituent campus of the University of Wales Trinity Saint David.

Schools:
 School of Visual Communication
 School of Fine Art & Photography 
 School of Design & Applied Arts
 School of Film & Digital Media

Faculty of Humanities
Formerly Based on Swansea Metropolitan University's Townhill campus. The Faculty of Humanities provided teacher training and has an extensive range of undergraduate and postgraduate teaching programmes and has also expanded to include courses in performance and literature, counselling and psychology. The Facility of Humanities moved from the university Townhill Campus to SA1 Waterfront campus due to the university closing Townhill Campus. The campus was to be sold to developers.

Schools:
 School of Education 
 School of Social Sciences and Performing Arts

Faculty of Business and Management
Based on University of Wales Trinity Saint David, Business campus, High Street Swansea (the site of the former Swansea College of Technology). It had a portfolio of programmes which includes business, leisure and tourism, public services, management and health and social care.

Schools:
 Swansea Business School
 School of Leisure, Tourism and Sport
 School of Public Service Leadership

See also
List of universities in Wales

References

 
University of Wales Trinity Saint David
Education in Swansea
Organisations based in Swansea
1992 establishments in Wales
Defunct universities and colleges in Wales